The Place du Panthéon ([plas dy pɑ̃teɔ̃]) is a square in the 5th arrondissement of Paris, France. Located in the Latin Quarter, it is named after and surrounds the Panthéon.

Rue Soufflot, west of the Place du Panthéon, runs towards Boulevard Saint-Michel. The Lycée Henri-IV, former Abbey of Saint Genevieve, is located east of the square, just south of Saint-Étienne-du-Mont.

Gallery

See also
 Squares in Paris

Pantheon
Buildings and structures in the 5th arrondissement of Paris
Pantheon